Adam Wojciech Niedzielski (born 19 November 1973) is a Polish economist. He is the former President of the National Health Fund and the current Minister of Health of the Republic of Poland.

Academic career 
He graduated from the Faculty of Economics and Faculty of Quantitative Methods and Information Systems at the Warsaw School of Economics. In 2003 he was awarded a doctorate in economic sciences at the Institute of Economics of the Polish Academy of Sciences.

Professional work 
Niedzielski began his professional career at the Department of Financial Politics and Analysis of the Ministry of Finance, where from 1996 to 1998 he was involved in macroeconomic analysis. From 1998 to 2004 he worked at the Institute of Market Economics. From 1999 to 2007 he worked at the Higher School of Trade and International Finance. From 2002 to 2007 he served as an economic advisor to the Supreme Audit Office. From 2007 to 2013 he was the director of the Department of Finances and the Department of Controlling at the Social Insurance Institution, and from 2013 to 2016 he was the director of the Department of Strategy and Deregulation of the Ministry of Justice. In February 2016 he became the Advisor to the President of the Social Insurance Institution. He acted as the Director-General of the Ministry of Finance from November 2016. In 2018 the Minister of Health Łukasz Szumowski appointed him as the vice-president of Operations of the National Health Fund. In 2019 he became the President of the NHF.

On 18 August 2020 Łukasz Szumowski resigned from his position as the Minister of Health. Two days later, the Prime Minister of Poland Mateusz Morawiecki announced that Adam Niedzielski will replace Szumowski as the head of the ministry. On 26 August 2020 he was appointed to the office by the President of Poland Andrzej Duda.

References 

Health ministers of Poland
SGH Warsaw School of Economics alumni
1973 births
Living people
21st-century  Polish economists